Crest is a commune in the Drôme department in the Auvergne-Rhône-Alpes region of Southeastern France. In 2017, it had a population of 8,505.

Population
Its inhabitants are called Crestois.

Sights
The  Tour de Crest, one of the highest medieval keeps in France - 52 m. Its height dominates the town. The tower was part of a castle which guarded one of the entrances to the Pre-Alps in Drôme. The site offers a large panoramic view.
There are various exhibitions in the castle plus information about the Tour's past including the fact that it has served as a prison in the past.

The Tour holds two spectacular carved wooden doors one of which is believed to depict the original castle.

Saint-Sauveur Church

Monument to the resistance to the coup d'état of 2 December 1851 in Provence.

There is an artisanal chocolate manufacturer in the town with a chocolate museum attached. The museum has a model of the tour in chocolate and various scenes in the history of chocolate also created in chocolate.

The town is still substantially medieval with steep narrow lanes leading up to the Tour.

Twin towns 

Crest is twinned with:
 Cromer in Norfolk, England,
 Nidda, Germany 
 Ponte San Nicolò, Italy
 Medvode, Slovenia

See also
Communes of the Drôme department
Parc naturel régional du Vercors

References

External links

Communes of Drôme